Stranahan-DelVecchio House is a historic home located at Athens in Greene County, New York.  It was built in 1852 and is a majestic Greek Revival–style structure.  It has a -story central block with 2-story symmetrical wings.  It features a 3-story portico supported by Ionic columns.

It was listed on the National Register of Historic Places in 1980.

References

Houses on the National Register of Historic Places in New York (state)
Houses completed in 1852
Houses in Greene County, New York
National Register of Historic Places in Greene County, New York
1852 establishments in New York (state)